Sexual slavery may refer to:

 Sexual slavery
 Human trafficking
 Sex Slaves (film)
 Sexual slavery (BDSM)